William Lenihan (17 May 1921 – 27 May 2009) was an Irish boxer. He competed in the men's bantamweight event at the 1948 Summer Olympics.

References

1921 births
2009 deaths
Irish male boxers
Olympic boxers of Ireland
Boxers at the 1948 Summer Olympics
Place of birth missing
Bantamweight boxers